A Tier 2 network is an Internet service provider which engages in the practice of peering with other networks, but which also purchases IP transit to reach some portion of the Internet.

Tier 2 providers are the most common Internet service providers, as it is much easier to purchase transit from a Tier 1 network than to peer with them and attempt to become a Tier 1 carrier.

The term Tier 3 is sometimes also used to describe networks who solely purchase IP transit from other networks to reach the Internet.

List of large or important Tier 2 networks

See also
 Peering point
Network access point

References

Internet architecture